John Honeysett (1938–2018) was an English greyhound trainer. He was the UK trainers championship winner in 1979.

Profile
Honeysett worked for Paddy Coughlan before obtaining his own private trainers license. In 1978 he joined Crayford & Bexleyheath Stadium as a contracted trainer. He was propelled to fame within the industry when winning the 1979 Trainers Championship.

In 1980 he steered Corduroy through to the final of the 1980 English Greyhound Derby and one year later Clohast Fame reached the 1981 English Greyhound Derby. During 1983 he switched from Crayford to join Wembley. He trained out of Pendene Farm and Kennels in Redhill, Surrey. 

From 1986 - 1989 he handled four successive English Greyhound Derby finalists, Easy Prince, Stouke Whisper (twice) and Early Vocation. His owners included Patsy Byrne.

When Wembley was threatened by closure Honeysett joined Catford Stadium but retired from the sport in 1997.

Awards
He won the 1979 Trainers Championship.

References 

1938 births
2018 deaths
British greyhound racing trainers